Percy Ford may refer to:

 Percy Ford (cricketer) (1877–1920), an English cricketer
 Percy Ford (racing driver) (1888–1962), an American racing driver